Svárov is a municipality and village in Kladno District in the Central Bohemian Region of the Czech Republic. It has about 600 inhabitants.

Etymology
The name Svárov was derived from the personal name Svár, meaning "Svár's (property)".

Geography
It lies in the Křivoklát Highlands. The Loděnice River briefly flows through the municipal territory. In the centre of the village is the Svárovský Pond.

History
The first written mention of Svárov is from 1249, when it was owned by the Břevnov Monastery. It was owned by various lower nobles for most of its history. From 1732 until the establishment of an independent municipality in 1850, the village was part of the Buštěhrad estate.

Sights
The landmark of Svárov is the Church of Saint Lucas. It was first documented in 1352, but it has a Romanesque core, which indicates an older origin. The church was probably extended in the late Renaissance period, then it was baroque rebuilt.

References

External links

Villages in Kladno District